A controlled ankle motion walking boot, or CAM boot, also sometimes called a below knee walking boot or moon boot, is an orthopedic device prescribed for the treatment and stabilization of severe sprains, fractures, and tendon or ligament tears in the ankle or foot. In situations where ankle motion but not weight is to be limited, it may be used in place of a cast.

Description 

A walking boot consists of:
An inner lining, usually fabric, with hook and loop fasteners which encloses and cushions the patient's foot and ankle
A rigid frame to restrict motion in the lower leg
A hard plastic shell that provides rigidity and protection to the leg
Adjustable closure system that allows for proper fitting to various leg sizes

Variations 

CAM walkers may range in height from mid-calf to nearly knee-length, depending on the condition they are meant to treat.  Some contain inflatable compartments that can be adjusted by the patient for maximum support and comfort.  For further protection of the injured ankle and leg, CAM walkers may also utilize a more extensive plastic shell that also encloses the back and sides of the walker, with detachable plastic plates for the front.

Comparison to casting 

While CAM walkers do not provide the same degree of immobility that an orthopedic cast offers, they have some advantages. Unlike casts, they are adjustable and reusable, and fully removable, permitting the patient to bathe the foot and ankle and remove the walker at night, if they so desire; and a CAM walker requires no special modifications for the patient to bear weight and walk. With some fractures, however, removal may result in worse outcomes and thus this may be a negative; also, with some fractures, the person should be non-weight bearing. Additionally, there is greater cost.

For more severe fractures, a traditional cast may still be preferable.

References

Further reading
 
 
 
 
 

Orthopedic treatment